Galiteuthis pacifica is a little known species of glass squid from the family Cranchiidae. It has never been fully described despite having a wide distribution in the tropical Indo-Pacific. The males grow to at least 333mm in mantle length.

References

Squid
Molluscs described in 1948